Çukur is a village in the Tunceli District, Tunceli Province, Turkey. The village is populated by Kurds of the Alan tribe and had a population of 101 in 2021.

The hamlets of Alibaba, Aydoğdu, Bozdere, Gölgeli, Güçlü, Konuklu, Köyaltı and Taşoluk are attached to the village.

References 

Kurdish settlements in Tunceli Province
Villages in Tunceli District